Jeremy Hunt (born 12 March 1974) is a British former road racing cyclist who raced for numerous years mainly a sprinter. Hunt was the winner of the British National Road Race Championships in 1997 and 2001. He now works as a directeur sportif for UCI Continental team .

Career
Hunt was born in Canada and grew up in England, firstly in Bury before moving to Devon. His father had been an amateur racing cyclist, and as a teenager in Devon Hunt was coached by former Tour de France rider Colin Lewis. He pursued his career in northern France before turning professional.

He spent 1 season for MBK-Oktos until in 2004 he joined . Hunt joined  in 2008, following the demise of the MrBookmaker, now called Unibet.com. In 2009 he joined , where he made his Tour de France debut in 2010 at the age of 36, having previously turned down the opportunity of racing in the Tour whilst at Banesto in 1997. In October 2010, after the demise of the Cervélo team, he was announced as a member of 's 2011 line-up.

Hunt was part of the Great Britain team that helped Mark Cavendish win the road race at the 2011 UCI Road World Championships.

Personal life
He is the half-brother of racing cyclist Joshua Hunt.

Major results

1994
 1st Stage 16 Commonwealth Bank Classic
1995
 1st GP Cristal Energie
 1st Internatie Reningelst
 1st Stage 1 Commonwealth Bank Classic
1997
 1st  Road race, National Road Championships
 Tour de l'Avenir
1st Stages 3 & 9
 1st Circuito de Getxo
 1st Stage 3 Commonwealth Bank Classic
 1st Stage 2 GP do Minho
 1st Stage 1 Circuit Cycliste de la Sarthe
 1st Stage 1 Vuelta Ciclista a la Rioja, Calahora
 1st Stage 5 Vuelta Ciclista a Aragón, Zaragoza
1998
 1st Trofeo Alcudia
 Volta a Portugal
1st Stages 10 & 14
 2nd Circuito de Getxo
1999
 1st Stage 2 Commonwealth Bank Classic
2000
 1st Sea Otter Classic
 1st Stage 9 Herald Sun Tour
 1st Stage 2 Tour Méditerranéen
2001
 1st  Road race, National Road Championships
 1st Stage 4 Circuit Franco-Belge
 1st Stage 2 Tour de la Somme
 4th Nokere Koerse
 6th GP de Fourmies
 7th Grand Prix de la Ville de Lillers
 10th Cholet-Pays de Loire
2002
 1st GP Ouest-France
 3rd Road race, National Road Championships
 5th Paris–Bourges
 5th Gran Premio della Costa Etruschi
2003
 1st Stage 2 Tour de Picardie
 2nd Road race, National Road Championships
2004
 3rd Road race, National Road Championships
 4th Paris–Brussels
 8th Nokere Koerse
 9th Druivenkoers Overijse
 10th Dwars door Vlaanderen
2005
 1st Stage 2 Tour de Wallonie
 8th E3 Prijs Vlaanderen
2006
 2nd Dwars door Vlaanderen
 3rd Nokere Koerse
 6th Overall Tour de Picardie
 6th Kampioenschap van Vlaanderen
 7th GP de Fourmies
 9th Scheldeprijs
 10th Cholet-Pays de Loire
2007
 1st Grand Prix d'Ouverture La Marseillaise
 2nd Paris–Brussels
 4th Schaal Sels-Merksem
 7th Overall Tour de Wallonie
2008
 1st Stage 2 Tour de Langkawi
 3rd Overall Delta Tour Zeeland
2009
 1st Stage 4 Post Danmark Rundt
 2nd National Criterium Championships
 3rd Kuurne–Brussels–Kuurne
 5th Overall Delta Tour Zeeland
 10th Gent–Wevelgem
2010
 4th Road race, National Road Championships
2011
 1st East Yorkshire Classic
 6th Overall Tour of Qatar
2012
 5th Road race, National Road Championships

General classification results timeline

References

External links

 

Canadian male cyclists
English male cyclists
1974 births
Living people
Cyclists from Saskatchewan
British cycling road race champions
Cyclists at the 2000 Summer Olympics
Olympic cyclists of Great Britain